Joseph Sirois (2 October 1881 – 17 January 1941), baptised Louis-Philippe-Marie-Joseph Sirois, was a Canadian notary and professor. He was the second chairman of the eponymous Rowell–Sirois Commission.

References 
 

1881 births
1941 deaths
Quebec notaries
Academic staff of Université Laval
Place of birth missing
Université Laval alumni